Ticket to Ride is the debut studio album by American music duo Carpenters. At the time of its initial release in 1969, it was issued under the title Offering, with a completely different cover photo. It was a commercial failure and produced only one minor hit single, a ballad version of the Lennon-McCartney song "Ticket to Ride".

After the Carpenters' subsequent breakthrough, however, the album was reissued internationally under the name Ticket to Ride and sold moderately. The CD in the "Remastered Classics" series went out of print in March 2007. However, in Japan, the "Pack Series" released the Ticket to Ride and Close to You CDs together.

The album is far more self-contained than other Carpenters albums; excluding the orchestrations, bass by Joe Osborn and occasional guitar from Gary Sims, most of the instruments were played by Karen and Richard Carpenter themselves—drums and keyboards respectively—and 10 of the 13 songs were written by Richard and his lyricist John Bettis. It also stands out from subsequent Carpenters albums in that the lead vocals are evenly split between the two band members; on later albums, Karen would perform most of the lead vocals and this is one of two albums where Karen provided virtually all of the drumming, the other being Now & Then, released in 1973.

Track listing
All lead vocals by Karen Carpenter except where noted; all tracks written by Richard Carpenter and John Bettis, except where noted.

Personnel
Richard Carpenter – lead and backing vocals, piano, Wurlitzer electric piano, harpsichord
Karen Carpenter – lead and backing vocals, drums, electric bass on "All of My Life" and "Eve"
Joe Osborn – bass
Bob Messenger – bass
Gary Sims – guitar on "All of My Life"
Herb Alpert – shakers
Technical
Producer: Jack Daugherty
Engineer: Ray Gerhardt
Art director: Tom Wilkes
Photographer: Jim McCrary
Bernie Grundman, Richard Carpenter – remastering at Bernie Grundman Mastering

Charts

Album

Singles

"Ticket to Ride"
 JP 7" single (1969) [KING AM-18] / (1976) [KING AM-1001] / (1977) [KING AM-2061] 
"Ticket to Ride"
"All I Can Do"

 US 7" single (1969) [A&M 1142]
"Ticket to Ride"
"Your Wonderful Parade"

References

1969 debut albums
The Carpenters albums
Albums produced by Jack Daugherty (musician)
A&M Records albums
Albums recorded at A&M Studios